Arno Monsecour (born 19 January 1996) is a Belgian footballer who plays for KSC Lokeren in the Belgian First Division A as a right back.

Club career
Arno Monsecour started his career with KSC Lokeren.

External links
 

1996 births
Living people
Association football fullbacks
Belgian footballers
K.S.C. Lokeren Oost-Vlaanderen players
Belgian Pro League players